The Get Rubber campaign is an STI awareness campaign spearheaded by the Brazzers network that focuses on the global HIV/AIDS crisis.  The campaign is centered on the bringing awareness to adult industry consumers using a series of public service announcements featuring adult video stars such as Bree Olson, Rachel_Roxxx and Nikki Benz.  The aims is to remind consumers of pornographic material that adult content is created in a controlled setting and is not to be imitated irresponsibly.

Related groups

Stop AIDS Campaign
Brazzers

References

HIV/AIDS activism
HIV/AIDS prevention organizations